CalorieMate (カロリーメイト karorīmeito) is a brand of nutritional energy bar and energy gel foods produced by Otsuka Pharmaceutical Co., in Japan.  It was first released in 1983 debuting with a cheese flavored block. CalorieMate comes in several forms, including Block, Jelly, and Can.  CalorieMate Block (カロリーメイト　ブロック karorīmeito burokku) resembles a bar-shaped cookie (somewhat like a shortbread), sold in packs of either two or four.  CalorieMate Jelly (カロリーメイト　ゼリー karorīmeito zerī) is a gelatin sold in a pouch with a spout.  CalorieMate Can (カロリーメイト　缶 karorīmeito kan) is a canned drink.

Flavors

Block
 Cheese (Black Label) (1983) 
 Fruit (Green Label) (1984)
 Chocolate (Red Label) (1993)
 Maple (Pink Label) (2009)
 Plain (White Label) (2014)
 Vanilla (Light Blue Label) (2022)

Jelly
 Apple (Pink Label)
 Fruity Milk (Blue Label)
 Lime & Grapefruit (Green Label)
 100kcal (Black Label)

Can
 Corn Soup 
 Café au lait (Red Label)
 Coffee 
 Cocoa
 Fruit Mix (Green Label)
 Yogurt (Blue Label)

See also
 List of food companies

References

External links

Official CalorieMate website

Dietary supplements
Energy food products
Otsuka Pharmaceutical
Products introduced in 1983